Cassytha racemosa (common name - dodder laurel) is a parasitic perennial in the Lauraceae family.<ref name=florabase>{{FloraBase|name=Cassytha racemosa|id=2957}}</ref>
It is found in Western Australia.

The species was first described in 1845 by Christian Gottfried Daniel Nees von Esenbeck from specimen 1623 found near the town of Fremantle growing on Melaleuca huegelii''.

References

External links
Flora of Australia online Cassytha racemosa

racemosa
Flora of Western Australia
Taxa named by Christian Gottfried Daniel Nees von Esenbeck
Plants described in 1845